Moussy may refer to the following places in France:

 Moussy, Marne, a commune in the Marne department
 Moussy, Nièvre, a commune in the Nièvre department
 Moussy, Val-d'Oise, a commune in the Val-d'Oise department